Harry Wait (25 November 1891 – 1975) was an English footballer who played in the Football League for Walsall.

References

1891 births
1975 deaths
English footballers
Association football goalkeepers
English Football League players
Darlaston Town F.C. players
Walsall F.C. players